Chauvenet is a lunar impact crater that is located to the northeast of the prominent crater Tsiolkovskiy on the far side of the Moon. Less than one crater diameter to the northwest of Chauvenet is the crater Ten Bruggencate.

The rim of this crater is roughly circular, with the satellite crater Chauvenet C overlying the northeastern side and intruding into the interior. A ridge runs from the western side of this intruding feature to the midpoint of the interior of Chauvenet. The remainder of the floor is marked only by a number of tiny craterlets. There is a shelf of slumped material forming a terrace along the southeast inner wall. The remainder of the inner wall is somewhat irregular in form.

Satellite craters
By convention these features are identified on lunar maps by placing the letter on the side of the crater midpoint that is closest to Chauvenet.

References

 
 
 
 
 
 
 
 
 
 
 
 

Impact craters on the Moon